System Settings (System Preferences on macOS Monterey and earlier) is an application included with macOS. It allows users to modify various system settings, which are divided into separate Preference Panes. The System Settings application was introduced in the first version of Mac OS X to replace the control panels found in earlier versions of the Mac operating system.

History

Control Panel (classic Mac OS)
Before the release of Mac OS X in 2001, users modified system settings using control panels. Control panels, like the preference panes found in System Preferences, were separate resources (cdevs) that were accessed through the Apple menu's Control Panel.

A rudimentary form of system preferences dates back to 1983 with the Apple Lisa Preferences menu item. This included a subset of configurable settings called "convenience settings" as well as other settings that adapted according to the programs and devices installed on the Lisa Office System. The original control panels in the earliest versions of the classic Mac OS were all combined into one small Desk Accessory. Susan Kare designed the interface for the original control panel, and tried to make it as user-friendly as possible. This design was used until System 3 when separate control panel files ("cdev"s) were added, accessible solely through the control panel.

With the debut of System 7 the control panels were separated into individual small application-like processes accessible from the Finder, and by a sub-menu in the Apple menu provided by Apple Menu Options. Mac OS 9, the last release of the Mac OS before Mac OS X, included 32 control panels. By Mac OS 9, many control panels had been rewritten as true applications.

The control panels included with Mac OS 9 are:

 Appearance
 Apple Menu Options
 AppleTalk
 ColorSync
 Control Strip
 Date & Time
 DialAssist
 Energy Saver
 Extensions Manager
 File Exchange
 File Sharing
 File Synchronization
 General Controls
 Internet
 Keyboard
 Keychain Access
 Launcher
 Location Manager
 Memory
 Modem
 Monitors
 Mouse
 Multiple Users
 Numbers
 QuickTime Settings
 Remote Access
 Software Update
 Sound
 Speech
 Startup Disk
 TCP/IP
 Text
 Web Sharing

System Preferences (Mac OS X)

When Mac OS X was released, preference panes replaced control panels. Preference panes are not applications but loadable bundles for the System Preferences application, similar to the arrangement used under System 6. By default, System Preferences organizes preference panes into several categories. As of Mac OS X v10.7, these categories are "Personal", "Hardware", "Internet & Wireless", and "System". A fifth category, "Other", appears when third-party preference panes are installed. Users can also choose to sort preference panes alphabetically. System Preferences originally included a customizable toolbar into which frequently-used preference pane icons could be dragged, but this was removed in Mac OS X v10.4 and replaced with a static toolbar that featured back and forward navigation buttons and a search field.

Apple has added new preference panes when major features are added to the operating system and occasionally merges multiple panes into one. When Exposé was introduced with Mac OS X v10.3, a corresponding preference pane was added to System Preferences. This was replaced by a single "Dashboard & Exposé" pane in Mac OS X v10.4, which introduced Dashboard. When the .Mac service was replaced by MobileMe, the corresponding preference pane was also renamed.

In OS X Mountain Lion, the "Universal Access" pane is changed to "Accessibility" and "Speech" is changed to "Dictation & Speech".

System Settings (macOS Ventura)

In macOS Ventura, System Preferences was renamed to System Settings. System setting has a new user interface that is similar to the iOS/iPadOS Settings app. Each category is on a sidebar to the left of the window, instead of the original preference panes that were used in System Preferences. If AirPods are connected, a menu for the AirPods will appear at the top of System Settings.

See also 

 Settings (for iOS)

References

External links
 Mac Basics: Set your preferences, Apple Support
 The untold history of macOS System Preferences

Computer configuration
MacOS
Macintosh operating systems
Macintosh operating systems user interface
MacOS-only software made by Apple Inc.